Merry Christmas is a compilation of Christmas songs that originally appeared on That Christmas Feeling (1968), Oh Happy Day (1970), The Christmas Sound of Music (1969) and The Night Before Christmas (1984).

Track listing
"The Christmas Song (Merry Christmas to You)" (Mel Tormé/Rob Wells) - 3:02
"Have Yourself a Merry Little Christmas" (Hugh Martin/Ralph Blane) - 3:11
"Christmas Is for Children" (Sammy Cahn/Jimmy Van Heusen) - 3:19
"Silent Night, Holy Night" (Frans Gruber/Joseph Mohr) - 2:29
"One Pair of Hands" (Billy Campbell/Manny Curtis) - 2:30
"White Christmas" (Irving Berlin) - 2:42
"Pretty Paper" (Willie Nelson) - 2:34
"It Must Be Getting Close to Christmas" (Cahn/Van Heusen) - 2:29
"There's No Place Like Home" (Cahn) - 3:16
"The Night Before Christmas" (Traditional) - 3:19

Production
Art direction/design - Simon Levy
Photography - Peter Nash
Digital editing by Milan Bogdan
Mastered by Glenn Meadows at Masterfonics

1991 Christmas albums
Christmas albums by American artists
1991 compilation albums
Christmas compilation albums
Glen Campbell compilation albums
Liberty Records compilation albums
Country Christmas albums